Szofi Kiss (born 17 January 1995) is a Hungarian synchronized swimmer. She competed in the women's duet at the 2012 Summer Olympics.

References 

1995 births
Living people
Hungarian synchronized swimmers
Olympic synchronized swimmers of Hungary
Synchronized swimmers at the 2012 Summer Olympics
Sportspeople from Budapest